The 2004 Penn Quakers football team represented the University of Pennsylvania in the 2004 NCAA Division I-AA football season. It was the 128th season of play for the Quakers. They were led by 13th-year head coach Al Bagnoli and played their home games at Franklin Field. They finished the season 8–2 overall and 6–1 in conference play, placing second in the Ivy League.

Schedule

References

Penn
Penn Quakers football seasons
Penn Quakers football